Roque Antonio Adames Rodríguez (November 8, 1928 – October 31, 2009) was Catholic bishop of what is now the Archdiocese of Santiago de los Caballeros, Dominican Republic.

Ordained on April 17, 1954, Pope Paul VI appointed Adames Rodríguez bishop and he was ordained on May 22, 1966, resigning on April 22, 1992.

Notes

1928 births
2009 deaths
20th-century Roman Catholic bishops in the Dominican Republic
Roman Catholic bishops of Santiago de los Caballeros
White Dominicans